Port Stanvac is  a former port and oil refinery in the suburb of Lonsdale  south of Adelaide city centre in South Australia. It was operated by ExxonMobil between 1963 and 2003. Since its closure, the port and adjoining land-based refinery site have been decommissioned.

Oil refinery 

It was announced in 1958 that a refinery with a designed capacity of 3.3 million tons per annum and owned by ExxonMobil would be built at Port Stanvac. The refinery first processed crude oil there in 1963. Its closure in 2003 resulted in the loss more than 400 jobs. Decommissioning and remediation of the  site is ongoing and is expected to continue until 2019. Once the site has been decommissioned, the land is expected to be sold in phases. Demolition of the refinery was completed in 2014.

Port Stanvac jetty 

The Port Stanvac jetty is 670 metres long, and since the refinery's closure in 2003 remains with an exclusion zone for the purposes of public safety. The structure terminates in waters 12 to 15 metres deep.

In October 2015, the South Australian government committed to retaining the existing 215 metre rock groyne adjoining the jetty, but according to ExxonMobil "had not identified a viable alternate use for the defunct structure." Mobil agreed to fund upgrade works estimated to cost $5.7 million to ensure that the groyne would be safe prior to opening it for public access. The jetty structure itself is expected to be demolished.

The Southern Times Messenger previously reported that ExxonMobil had offered the Port Stanvac Jetty to the City of Onkaparinga. This was to allow anglers and divers access in the hope that one day the jetty could be used for recreational fishing and diving. Onkaparinga Mayor Lorraine Rosenberg has said any responsibility for the jetty should fall to the Government of South Australia. Shore-based diving opportunities near suburban Adelaide are few, making the jetty structure a prospective new dive tourism attraction. Onkaparinga city development manager Terry Sutcliffe said one of the council's aims was to see the jetty used as a port for local industries and said the council would need to consider maintenance and liability costs if it chose to take over the jetty.

Oil spills 
A number of oil spill events occurred at or near Port Stanvac during the refinery's operating life. 

One such incident occurred on 20 July 1978 when oil was discharged from the vessel Aphrodite into Gulf St Vincent. 
On 22 January 1982, oil was spilled from the tanker Esso Gippsland during unloading at the Port Stanvac jetty. The slick was sprayed with chemical dispersant, applied from the air. Oil later washed ashore at Seaford and Aldinga Beach.
On 28 June 1999, approximately 230 tonnes of oil was discharged from an offshore loading connection to the refinery. The discharge occurred 2 nautical miles offshore. The oil spill response in 1999 involved aerial spraying of 26.1 cubic metres of chemical dispersant and the employment of approximately 150 people in beach cleanups at beaches at Sellicks Beach and Aldinga Beach.

Grain terminal
The construction of a grain export terminal was proposed by the Australian Wheat Board and Australian Barley Board in 2002.  The proposal did not progress, due to the progression of the Outer Harbor AusBulk grain terminal in the existing port precinct area.  This was due to the additional infrastructure costs, and impacts on the community of additional freight movements in residential areas.

In popular culture 
The South Australian band The Dairy Brothers wrote a song called "Port Stanvac", for which they also produced a music video.

References

Economy of Adelaide
Gulf St Vincent
Redeveloped ports and waterfronts in Australia
Oil spills in Australia